Myrcia maestrensis is a species of plant in the family Myrtaceae. It is endemic to Cuba.

References

Endemic flora of Cuba
maestrensis
Endangered plants
Taxonomy articles created by Polbot
Taxobox binomials not recognized by IUCN